Registers Iceland is the main official civil registry for the nation of Iceland. It was formed in 2010 with the merger of Þjóðskrá and Fasteignaskrá Íslands.

References

External links 
 Official website 
  

Civil registries
Government agencies of Iceland